Niccolò de Rubini (died 8 August 1505) was a Roman Catholic prelate who served as Bishop of Lacedonia (1486–1505).

On 2 June 1486, Niccolò de Rubini was appointed during the papacy of Pope Innocent VIII as Bishop of Lacedonia.
He served as Bishop of Lacedonia until his death on 8 August 1505.

References

External links and additional sources
 (for Chronology of Bishops) 
 (for Chronology of Bishops) 

15th-century Italian Roman Catholic bishops
16th-century Italian Roman Catholic bishops
Bishops appointed by Pope Innocent VIII
1505 deaths